The Ministries of Jamaica are created at the discretion of the Prime Minister of Jamaica to carry out the functions of Government. As of 2016, the Prime Minister is The Most Honorable Andrew Holness, ON, MP. The agencies of Jamaica are created by both Parliamentary law and assigned to ministers to oversee. The governance structure consists of ministries with portfolios that have agencies that carry out its functions.

Ministries of Jamaica 

Ministry of Culture, Gender, Entertainment and Sport
Jamaica Cultural Development Commission
Women's Centre of Jamaica Foundation
Jamaica Anti-Doping Commission
The Institute of Jamaica
Jamaica National Heritage Trust
National Library of Jamaica
Sports Development Foundation
Ministry of Education, Youth and Information
National Education Inspectorate
Jamaica Teaching Council
HEART Trust/NTA
Overseas Examinations Commission
University Council of Jamaica
Nutrition Products Limited
Early Childhood Commission
Jamaica Library Service
National Council on Education
Overseas Examinations Commission (OEC)
Council of Community Colleges of Jamaica (CCCJ)
Jamaican Foundation for Lifelong Learning (JFLL)
Jamaica Tertiary Education Commission (J-TEC)
National Education Trust (NET)
National College for Educational Leadership (NCEL)
National Parenting Support Commission (NPSC)
Ministry of Finance and the Public Service
Jamaica Deposit Insurance Cooperation
Caymanas Track Limited
The Betting Gaming & Lotteries Commission (BGLC)
Tax Administration (TAJ)
Statistical Institute of Jamaica (SIOJ)
Planning Institute of Jamaica (PIOJ)
Jamaica Customs Agency (JCA)
Bank of Jamaica (BOJ)
Accountant General's Department
Ministry of Foreign Affairs and Foreign Trade
Ministry of Health
Pesticides Control Authority
National Health Fund
Government Chemist
National Public Health Lab
National Blood Transfusion Service Jamaica
National Family Planning Board
National Council on Drug Abuse
Councils of the Ministry of Health
Medical Council of Jamaica
Nursing Council of Jamaica
Dental Council of Jamaica
Pharmacy Council of Jamaica
Council of Professions Supplementary to Medicine
Ministry of Industry, Commerce, Agriculture and Fisheries
Anti- Dumping and Subsidies Commission
Bureau of Standards
Cannabis Licensing Authority
Companies Office of Jamaica
Consumer Affairs Commission
Department of Cooperatives and Friendly Societies
Fair Trading Commission
Food Storage and Prevention of Infestation Division
Jamaica 4-H Clubs
Jamaica Agricultural Society
Jamaica Business Development Corporation
Jamaica Intellectual Property Office
Jamaica National Agency for Accreditation (JANAAC)
Micro Investment Development Agency
National Compliance & Regulatory Authority
Office of the Government Trustee
Rural Agricultural Development Authority
SCJ Holdings Limited
Sugar Industry Authority
The Banana Board
Trade Board Limited
Ministry of Justice
Dispute Resolution Foundation
Legal Aid Clinic
Ministry of Labour and Social Security
Ministry of Local Government and Community Development
National Solid Waste Management Authority(NSWMA)
Jamaica Fire Brigade
Ministry of National Security
Jamaica Constabulary Force
Jamaica Defence Force
Passport, Immigration & Citizenship Agency
The Department of Correctional Services
Private Security Regulation Authority
Firearm Licensing Authority
Caribbean Regional Drug Law Enforcement Training Centre
Major Organized Crime and Anti-Corruption Agency
Private Security Regulation Authority
Jamaica Combined Cadet Force
Ministry of Science, Energy and Technology
The Earthquake Unit
Clarendon Alumina Production
The International Centre for Environmental & Nuclear Sciences
Jamaica Bauxite Institute
National Commission on Science and Technology
Scientific Research Council
e-Learning Jamaica
The Postal Corporation of Jamaica
Spectrum Management Authority Limited
Universal Service Fund
eGOV Jamaica Limited
Petrojam Ethanol Limited
Government Electrical Inspectorate
Petroleum Corporation of Jamaica
Petrojam Limited
Rural Electrification Programme (REP)
Wigton Windfarm
Board of Examiners
Ministry of Tourism
Tourism Enhancement Fund
Tourism Product Development Company
Jamaica Tourist Board
Jamaica Vacation Limited
Devon House Development Company
Milk River Hotel and Spa
Bath Foundation Hotel and Spa
Ministry of Transport and Mining
Port Security Corps
Caribbean Maritime Institute
Maritime Authority of Jamaica
Airports Authority of Jamaica
Jamaica Civil Aviation Authority
Aeronautical Telecommunications Ltd.
Jamaica Urban Transit Company
Transport Authority
Jamaica Railway Corporation
Functions of The Corporation:
Montego Bay Metro
Jamaica Ultimate Tyre Company
The MGD
 Ministry of Economic Growth and Job Creation
 Agro Investment Corporation
 Beach Control Authority
 Commission of Strata Corporations
 Development Bank of Jamaica
 Factories Corporation of Jamaica (FCJ)
 Forestry Department
 Harmonization Limited
 Housing Agency of Jamaica (HAJ)
 IMF Coordination Unit
 Jamaica Business Development Centre (JBDC)
 Jamaica International Financial Services Authority
 Jamaica Mortgage Bank (JMB)
 JAMPRO
 Kingston Container Terminal
 Kingston Free Zone
 Land Administration and Management Programme (LAMP)
 Land Development and Utilization Commission
 Land Divestment Advisory Committee
 Meteorological Department
 Micro Investment Development Agency (MIDA)
 Montego Free Zone
 National Environment and Planning Agency (NEPA)
 National Export-Import Bank of Jamaica (EXIM Bank)
 National Housing Trust (NHT)
 National Land Agency (NLA)
 National Road Operating & Constructing Company (NROCC)
 National Spatial Data Management Unit
 National Water Commission (NWC)
 National Works Agency (NWA)
 Planning Institute of Jamaica (PIOJ)
 Port Authority Management Services
 Port Authority of Jamaica (PAJ)
 Real Estate Board
 Relocation of Human Settlements
 Rent Assessment Board
 Road Maintenance Fund (RMF)
 Rural Water Supply Company
 Self-Start Fund
 Statistical Institute of Jamaica (STATIN)
 Toll Authority
 Toll Regulator
 Urban Development Corporation (UDC)
 Water Resource Authority (WRA)
 Land, Environment and Climate Change
 Beach Control Authority
 Forestry Department
 Land Administration and Management Programme (LAMP)
 Land Development and Utilisation Commission
 Land Divestment Advisory Committee
 Meteorological Department
 National Environment and Planning Agency (NEPA)
 National Land Agency (NLA)
 National Spatial Data Management Unit
 Housing
 Commission of Strata Corporations
 Housing Agency of Jamaica (HAJ)
 Jamaica Mortgage Bank (JMB)
 Real Estate Board
 Relocation of Human Settlements
 Rent Assessment Board
 Water
 National Water Commission (NWC)
 Rural Water Supply Company
 Water Resource Authority (WRA)
 Works
 National Road Operating & Constructing Company (NROCC)
 National Works Agency (NWA)
 Road Maintenance Fund (RMF)
 Toll Authority
 Toll Regulator

Agencies of Jamaica

 Access to Information Unit
 Constituency Development Fund
 Culture, Health, Arts, Sports & Education (CHASE)
 Electoral Commission of Jamaica (ECJ)
 Integrity Commission
 Jamaica Defence Force
 Jamaica Information Service (JIS)
 Jamaica Social Investment Fund (JSIF)


References

Government of Jamaica